Egon Steuer (born November 23, 1935) is a Slovak retired basketball player and coach. He played in the professional league of his country, playing for, Sparta Prague, Slovan Bratislava and the Czechoslovakian national team.

Career as coach

First episode in the Netherlands
In the mid-1960s, Egon Steuer became the head coach of the Netherlands national basketball team. He stayed on for 4 years.

Episode in France
After his successful tenure in The Netherlands, Egon Steuer was contracted by Olympique Antibes as head coach. With that team he won 2 French National Championships. He stayed in France as a coach for 8 years. He also met his Dutch wife, Yvonne Steuer-Walthausen, while he lived in France. They were married by the Mayor of Nice in a celebrity studded event.

Second episode in the Netherlands
Together with his Dutch wife, Egon returned to The Netherlands in 1977, and went on to be a successful coach in Dutch basketball teams. He coached, Haarlem, Amsterdam and Den Bosch.

Career after basketball
When he retired from basketball in 1981, Egon refocused on his "other" career, architectural engineering. He worked as an architect for a Dutch agency for 4 years, and co-designed the new headquarter building of Dutch multinational Philips N.V. in Eindhoven. After that, he became president and CEO of one of Amsterdam's leading social housing companies, which grew its portfolio of houses and apartments from several thousands when he started, to close to 40.000 when he retired in 2001.
Since his retirement Egon has been active as Managing Advisor for Bouwfonds N.V., a Dutch ABN Amro Bank N.V. owned real estate developer. Steuer is in charge of their Eastern European development.

Personal life 
Egon lives with his wife in a suburb of Amsterdam. He has two grown sons, Michael Steuer (1978) and David Steuer (1981).

References

1935 births
Living people
Czechoslovak men's basketball players
Basketball coaches
Slovak men's basketball players
Sportspeople from Košice